Juan Ignacio Chela was the defending champion but was eliminated in the semifinals by Pablo Andújar.
Florian Mayer won the title, defeating Pablo Andújar 6–3, 6–1 in the final.

Seeds
The top four seeds received a bye into the second round.

Draw

Finals

Top half

Bottom half

Qualifying draw

Seeds

  Thomas Schoorel (qualifying competition)
  Florent Serra (qualified)
  Evgeny Donskoy (qualifying competition)
  Alessandro Giannessi (qualified)
  Gianluca Naso (qualified)
  Jonathan Eysseric (second round)
  Peter Torebko (qualified)
  Olivier Patience (qualifying competition)

Qualifiers

  Gianluca Naso
  Florent Serra
  Peter Torebko
  Alessandro Giannessi

First qualifier

Second qualifier

Third qualifier

Fourth qualifier

References
 Main Draw
 Qualifying Draw

BRD Nastase Tiriac Trophy - Singles
Romanian Open